The February flood of 1825, also known in Germany as the Great Hallig Flood (Große Halligflut), was a devastating flood that occurred from 3 to 5 February 1825 on the North Sea coast in which about 800 people were drowned.

Particularly affected was the North Sea coast of Jutland, Slesvig and Germany. The sand spit Agger Tange was broken through, and the Limfjord got its western opening to the sea. Henceforth, North Jutland has been an island.

In North Frisia, the unprotected islets, known as Halligen, were hit. Many dykes had already been damaged in November the year before by a severe storm surge. The island of Pellworm was completely flooded.

In East Frisia, the town of Emden was particularly hard hit. However, because the levees in the East Frisian area had been raised significantly in many places in the preceding years, the number of casualties, about 200, was smaller than it might have otherwise been.

In the Netherlands, the February flood was the worst natural disaster of the 19th century. Most of the dead and the worst damage occurred in Groningen, Friesland and Overijssel. The reaction at national level was quite similar to that during the Flood of 1953, but the former event was surprisingly quickly forgotten once the damage had been repaired and had no political or engineering consequences. The disaster of 1953 finally allowed a law on Delta Works to be passed for a significant improvement of coastal protection.

External links 
 H.-J. Rüger, Auswirkungen der Sturmflut von 1825 in unserer Region. Vortrag vor der Familienkundlichen Arbeitsgruppe der Männer vom Morgenstern am 5. Oktober 2002 ("Effects of the storm flood of 1825 in our region. Presentation to the Family History Working Group of the Men of Morgenstern on 5 Oct 2002"). Excerpts of sources in the possession of Land Wursten)

Floods in the Netherlands
Floods in Germany
History of East Frisia
1825 in Europe
1825 in the Netherlands
1825 in Germany
Storm tides of the North Sea
1825 floods in Europe
February 1825 events
1825 disasters in Germany 
1825 disasters in the Netherlands